Maamui is a Maldivian 2019 comedy film directed by Ali Shifau. Produced by Mohamed Ali and Aishath Fuad Thaufeeq under Dark Rain Entertainment, the film stars Sheela Najeeb, Mohamed Jumayyil, Mariyam Azza, Mohamed Faisal, Mariyam Majudha, Ismail Jumaih and Nuzuhath Shuaib in pivotal roles. The film was released on 1 July 2019.

Premise
The film follows story of Pradeep Rauf (Adam Rizwee), a half Maldivian, half Indian gangster, who cons people and loots their money, and then make them forget who they are. Pradeep is visited by his boss Hudhu Mukhthaar (Ahmed Shakir) who is about to launch a brand new drug called "Maamui". As preparations for the launch gets underway, local police gives chase to Pradeep, which forces him to hide the bottle inside Salman's house, using his family friendship with Salman's wife, Haifa (Mariyam Azza) as a pretext.

Pradeep's plan backfires When Haifa's mother-in-law accidentally adds Maamui into a drink she prepared for her lover. He behaves strangely due to the drug effect of the drug, catching police's attention. In a cat and mouse chase for the drug, Pradeep loses his memory and Mukhthaar barely manages to escape police custody.

Cast 
 Ahmed Shakir as Hudhu Mukhthar
 Adam Rizwee as Pradeep Rauf
 Mohamed Jumayyil as Salman
 Mariyam Azza as Haifa
 Sheela Najeeb as Vargina Saeed
 Ismail Jumaih as Aboobakuru Rushdy
 Mariyam Majudha as Taniya
 Abdullah Shafiu Ibrahim as Happu
 Nuzuhath Shuaib as Dhiyana
 Ahmed Sunie as Reethi Issey
 Ali Shazleem as Bunny
 Aishath Yaadha as Saniya
 Maria Teresa Pagano as Romani
 Samahath Razi Mohamed as Zara
 Ibrahim Aman as Arsalan
 Hamdhan Farooq as Rozy
 Ali Nadheeh as Switch
 Ismail Wajeeh as Jaguar
 Mariyam Sajiyath as Hudhu Mukhthar's fourth wife
 Ahmed Naavy Ali as Dhaniyal
 Ahmed Saeed as Dirty Boy
 Mohamed Najah as Hudhu Mukhthar's Bodyguard
 Mohamed Rifshan as Hudhu Mukhthar's Bodyguard
 Maleeha Waheed as a gym member
 Liam Adam as Jaguar's Bodyguard
 Mohamed Waheed
 Gasim Siraaj as Shifau
 Maisha Ahmed
 Arifa Ibrahim as Arifa Ahmed (special appearance)

Development
The film was announced on 28 July 2017. Initially, Dark Rain Entertainment planned to release Maamui as a web series. However, unable to raise enough funds to develop it as a web series, the production team decided to release it as a feature film. Producer Mohamed Ali said; "we failed to entice sponsor to fund for the project, hence we opt to release the film in theaters. However, we intend to develop individual characters from the film and create a web series based on it". In April 2018, the star cast was confirmed to include Mariyam Azza, Mohamed Jumayyil, Mohamed Faisal, Mariyam Majudha, Sheela Najeeb, Nuzuhath Shuaib, Abdullah Shafiu Ibrahim, Ismail Jumaih, Ahmed Sunil, Hamdhan Farooq, Mariyam Noora, Ahmed Shazleem, Adam Rizvee, Ahmed Shakir and Ibrahim Aman. The film also introduces director Shifau's wife, Aishath Yaadha, who had previously worked in an office-teledrama. Veteran actor Ismail Wajeeh is reported to be featured in a small appearance in the film. Filming for the first schedule of the project was started on 6 May 2018 for a total of ten days. Second schedule of filming was started post Ramazan and shooting was completed on 7 November 2018.

Soundtrack
A promotional video of "Araigen Aai Iraaey" was released on 28 June 2019 which serves as a tribute to the yesteryear Maldivian songs including "Vaareyge Paree", "E Keevvebaa Ithubaaru Kuraashey Mithuraa", "Angaadheyshey Adhuvee Ruhigen Ey Malaa", "Maheynethi Dhaaney", "Farivefa Fonivefa" and "Dhaneehey Aisbalaa".

Release
The film was released on 1 July 2019.

References

2019 films
Dark Rain Entertainment films
2019 comedy films
Maldivian comedy films
Films directed by Ali Shifau
Dhivehi-language films